Svartehallen is a village situated in Stenungsund Municipality, Västra Götaland County, Sweden with 201 inhabitants in 2005.

References 

Populated places in Västra Götaland County
Populated places in Stenungsund Municipality